Emmanuelle is a French feminine given name. It may refer to:
Emmanuelle Arsan (1932–2005), a Thai-French novelist
Emanuella Carlbeck (1829–1901), a Swedish social reformer
Emmanuelle Charpentier (born 1968), researcher in microbiology, genetics and biochemistry
Emmanuelle Chriqui (born 1975), a Canadian actress
Emmanuelle Claret (1968–2013), biathlete
Emmanuelle Gagliardi (born 1976), a Swiss tennis player
Emmanuelle Grey Rossum (born 1986), known as Emmy Rossum, an American actress
Emmanuelle Khanh (1937–2017), a French fashion designer and stylist
Emmanuelle Lambert (born 1975), French writer
Emmanuelle Proulx, vocalist and guitarist of the Canadian indie pop band Men I Trust
Emmanuelle Seigner (born 1966), a French actress, former fashion model and lead singer of Ultra Orange & Emmanuelle
Emmanuelle Vaugier (born 1976), a Canadian film and television actress
Sœur Emmanuelle (1908–2008), a Belgian and French religious sister

French feminine given names
Theophoric names